Brimfield is an unincorporated community in Orange Township, Noble County, in the U.S. state of Indiana.

History
Brimfield was laid out and platted in 1861. The community was likely named after Brimfield, in England. A post office was established at Brimfield in 1867, and remained in operation until it was discontinued in 1986.

Geography

References

Unincorporated communities in Noble County, Indiana
Unincorporated communities in Indiana
1861 establishments in Indiana